Puerto Santander may refer to:

 Puerto Santander, Amazonas, a town and municipality in the Amazonas Department, Colombia
 Puerto Santander, Norte de Santander, a town and municipality in the Norte de Santander Department, Colombia